Picea likiangensis, commonly known as Lijiang spruce, Lakiang spruce or Lijiang yunshan, is a species of spruce found in Bhutan and China. Its population has been reduced by 30% in 75 years by logging, and the species is therefore categorised as vulnerable by the IUCN.

References

Further reading

likiangensis
Trees of China
Trees of Bhutan
Vulnerable flora of Asia
Plants described in 1899
Taxonomy articles created by Polbot
Taxa named by Ernst Pritzel